CZ-1 may refer to:

 the Casio CZ-1 synthesizer
 the CZ-1 (Changzheng-1) missile